Patrick van Diemen (born 12 June 1972 in Woerden, Netherlands) is a Dutch retired footballer who ended his professional career in 2008 after playing 19 seasons on the highest level.

Club career
Van Diemen made his debut in professional football, being part of the FC Utrecht squad in the 1990–91 season. He also played for AZ, N.E.C., and had three seasons at Belgian giants Anderlecht before joining RKC Waalwijk for the second time in his career.

Player agent
In April 2013 van Diemen received his player agents licence while working for the VVCS, the Dutch players association.

Honours
Anderlecht
Belgian First Division A: 1999–2000, 2000–01
Belgian Super Cup: 2000

References

1972 births
Living people
People from Woerden
Association football midfielders
Dutch footballers
FC Utrecht players
AZ Alkmaar players
NEC Nijmegen players
RKC Waalwijk players
R.S.C. Anderlecht players
Eredivisie players
Eerste Divisie players
Belgian Pro League players
Dutch expatriate footballers
Expatriate footballers in Belgium
Dutch expatriate sportspeople in Belgium
Dutch sports agents
Association football agents
Footballers from Utrecht (province)